The 2014–15 season is Zamalek Sports Club 104th season of football since founded in 1911, 59th consecutive season in the Egyptian Premier League. The club will also play in the CAF Confederation Cup, after finishing 3rd in the 2013–14 Egyptian Premier League and winning the 2014 Egypt Cup.

Team kit
The team kits for this season are manufactured by Adidas.

Squad

Egyptian Football Association (EFA) rules are that a team may only have 3 foreign born players in the squad. 
The Squad Has 25 Players Registered as Professionals and 5 Players Registered (-U23) and 2 Players of the Youth academy

Out on loan

Transfers

In

Total expenditure: $5 million

Out

Total revenue:$1.7M

Net income:  $3.3M

Statistics

Goal scorers

Last updated: 15 August 2015

Notes:
Loan from Enppi ended on 29 December 2014.
Left on loan to Al-Ahli SC (Jeddah).

Assists table

Last updated: 3 August 2015

Pre-season and friendlies

Competitions

Overall

Egyptian Super Cup

Egyptian Premier League

League table

Results summary

Results by matchday

Matches

Egypt Cup

2015 CAF Confederation Cup

First round

Second round

Play-off round

Group stage

Knock-out stage

References

Zamalek SC seasons
Zamalek